Isaías Salvador Choto  (TBA- TBA) also known as Milo was a former Salvadoran footballer and coach.

External links
  (highlighted one of the earliest coaches of alianza)

Salvadoran footballers
Salvadoran football managers
Association footballers not categorized by position
Year of birth missing